The 155th Infantry Division (German: 155. Infanteriedivision) was a German Army infantry division in World War II.

History 
The 155th Infantry Division was raised some time before February 1945, when it was known to have been sent into Italy to reinforce the German and Italian armies, who were resisting the Allied advance during the Italian campaign.

Commanders 
Generalmajor Georg Zwade (February 1945 – 8 May 1945)

Operations Officers
Major Quellhorst (11 February 1945 – 1945)
Major Bernhard Diederichsen (20 March 1945 – 1 April 1945)
Major Eberhard Völkel (1 April 1945 – 1945)

See also 
 Division (military), Military unit, List of German divisions in World War II
 Army, Wehrmacht

References

Military units and formations established in 1945
Military units and formations disestablished in 1945
Infantry divisions of Germany during World War II